Türkyılmaz is a Turkish name and may refer to:

 Emel Türkyılmaz, Turkish basketball player
 İzzet Türkyılmaz, Turkish basketball player
 Kubilay Türkyilmaz, Swiss footballer of Turkish descent

Turkish masculine given names
Turkish-language surnames